Astralarctia venatorum is a moth of the family Erebidae first described by Hervé de Toulgoët in 1991. It is found in Ecuador.

References

Phaegopterina
Moths described in 1991
Moths of South America